Jan Ahmad (also Romanized as Jān Aḩmad) is a village in Ab Barik Rural District, in the Central District of Sonqor County, Kermanshah Province, Iran. At the 2006 census, its population was 17, in 5 families.

References 

Populated places in Sonqor County